Gianluca Naso and Walter Trusendi were the defending champions, but Naso chose to not compete this year.
Trusendi partnered with Thomas Fabbiano, but they were eliminated in the quarterfinal by Igor Zelenay and Lovro Zovko.
Daniele Bracciali and Alessandro Motti won in the final 6–4, 6–2, against Amir Hadad and Harel Levy.

Seeds

Draw

Draw

References
 Doubles Draw

AON Open Challenger - Doubles
AON Open Challenger
AON